Maurice Berty (15 July 1884 – 23 December 1946) was a French illustrator from Gionges, Marne.

1884 births
1946 deaths
French illustrators
People from Marne (department)